Winged Devils (Italian: Forza "G", literally "G" Force) is a 1972 Italian adventure-comedy film directed by Duccio Tessari.

Cast 
 
Riccardo Salvino: Lt. Gianni Orlando
Pino Colizzi: Cpt. Bergamini
Mico Cundari: Lt. Muschin
Ernesto Colli: Lt. Ernesto Del Prete
Barbara Bouchet: Karin 
Miranda Campa:  Ernesto's Mother
Anita Strindberg: Gianni's Friend
Magda Konopka: Gianni's Friend
Giancarlo Prete : Lt. Pettarin
Duccio Tessari :  De Santis
Dori Ghezzi

References

External links

1972 films
Italian adventure films
1970s adventure films
1970s Italian-language films
Films directed by Duccio Tessari
Films scored by Ennio Morricone
Italian aviation films
1970s Italian films